Tracey Larson (born May 1, 1978 in Lower Bucks, Pennsylvania) is a field hockey player from the United States, who made her international senior debut for the Women's National Team in 1999. Playing as a midfielder, the former student of the Penn State University was a member of the team, that won the silver medal at the 2003 Pan American Games in Santo Domingo, Dominican Republic.

International senior tournaments
 2000 – Olympic Qualifying Tournament, Milton Keynes, England (6th)
 2001 – Americas Cup, Kingston, Jamaica (2nd)
 2002 – Champions Challenge, Johannesburg, South Africa (5th)
 2002 – 10th World Cup, Perth, Australia (9th)
 2003 – Champions Challenge, Catania, Italy (5th)
 2003 – Pan American Games, Santo Domingo, Dominican Republic (2nd)
 2004 – Pan American Cup, Bridgetown, Barbados (2nd)
 2004 – Olympic Qualifying Tournament, Auckland, New Zealand (6th)

External links
 Profile on US Field Hockey

1978 births
Living people
American female field hockey players
Pennsylvania State University alumni
People from Bucks County, Pennsylvania
Female field hockey midfielders
Field hockey players at the 2003 Pan American Games
Medalists at the 2003 Pan American Games
Pan American Games silver medalists for the United States
Pan American Games medalists in field hockey
21st-century American women